Araminta Arrives is a 1921 play by the British writer Dorothy Brandon. It is a historical romantic comedy, set in the nineteenth century, about a young woman going to live with her aunt in London and becoming involved in a series of entanglements with men.

It premiered at the Winter Gardens Theatre in New Brighton before transferring for a West End run at the Comedy Theatre that lasted for 39 performances. The cast included Eileen Beldon in the title role, along with Herbert Bunston, Louise Hampton and Lady Tree.

References

1921 plays
Plays by Dorothy Brandon
British plays
Plays set in the 19th century
Plays set in London
West End plays